Rubus crataegifolius, also called Korean raspberry, is a species of raspberry native to East Asia.

It is a shrub growing to 1–2 m (rarely 3 m) tall. The leaves are 5–12 cm long and 5–8 cm broad, palmately lobed with three or five lobes, and a serrated margin. The flowers are 1–1.5 cm diameter, with five white petals. The fruit is an aggregate fruit 1 cm diameter, made up of numerous drupelets. The species grows on forest margins and mountain slopes, in areas with moist and well-drained soil.

Its fruit is used for food and is sometimes cultivated; the cultivar 'Jingu Jengal' has been selected for its large fruit. Root extracts have been found to contain substances with anti-inflammatory effects in mice.

Notes

External links
 
 
 

Fruits originating in East Asia
Garden plants of Asia
Medicinal plants
crataegifolius
Taxa named by Alexander von Bunge